Anoixi (meaning "spring") is a suburban town in East Attica, Greece. Since the 2011 local government reform it is part of the municipality Dionysos, of which it is a municipal unit. The municipal unit has an area of 4.582 km2.

Geography

Anoixi is situated in the hills in the northeastern part of the Athens conurbation, at about 370 m elevation. It lies east of the Parnitha mountains and northwest of the Penteliko Mountain. It is 1 km south of Agios Stefanos, 9 km west of Marathon and 20 km northeast of Athens city centre. Its built-up area is continuous with those of the neighbouring suburbs Agios Stefanos, Drosia and Stamata.

Motorway 1 (Athens - Lamia - Thessaloniki) and the railway from Athens to Thessaloniki pass west of the town. Greek National Road 83 (Athens - Marathon - Rafina) passes through Anoixi.

Historical population

See also
List of municipalities of Attica

References

Populated places in East Attica
Dionysos, Greece